Thomas Brooman  (b. 1 April 1954) is a festival organiser and promoter of music, best known for his role as co-founder and artistic director of the WOMAD (World of Music Arts & Dance) festival organisation.

Early life
Born in Bristol in 1954, he attended Bristol Grammar School and spent time during his childhood in Buenos Aires, Argentina. He attended Oxford University, reading English Language and Literature at Exeter College under the tutorship of Jonathan Wordsworth, graduating in 1976. The second child in an academic family, his father Frederick S. Brooman was an author and economics lecturer at Bristol University, subsequently Professor of Economics at The Open University.

Returning to Bristol after graduation from Oxford, Thomas took a path in music, firstly as a drummer during the heyday of punk music in the late 'seventies with several bands in Bristol, including The Media, The Spics and The Tesco Chainstore Massacre. In 1980, with a group of friends, he established a record magazine publication called The Bristol Recorder, and through this project made contact with the English artist Peter Gabriel with whom the concept of WOMAD was born.

WOMAD Festival
In early 1981, with Peter Gabriel and a group of colleagues, including Martin Elbourne, chef Jonathan Arthur, Stephen Pritchard and Bob Hooton, Thomas devised and organised the first WOMAD Festival in 1982. Over the following twenty six years he then worked as Festival and Artistic Director of the WOMAD Festival, leading the establishment of WOMAD as an organisation and its affiliated charity, the WOMAD Foundation, in 1983. WOMAD Festivals helped to establish a wider audience for many international artists and contributed to the identification of world music as a description of music from a global context.
 
As Artistic Director of WOMAD, through until 2008, he programmed and collaborated in the production of more than one hundred and forty five WOMAD Festivals and events in twenty-four countries and islands; in Africa, Asia, Australasia, Europe and North America.

Other activities
In 1987 he co-founded Real World Records, a label conceived as a creative partnership between Peter Gabriel and the WOMAD organisation.

In 2000 Thomas also ventured into the world of pub ownership with the purchase of Bristol's historic Palace Hotel in Old Market. Built in 1869, The Palace is a landmark Bristol City centre building and famous for its sloping bar floor and elaborate Victorian columns and ornamentation. At the time of its purchase in 2000, the whole building was in need of total refurbishment and Thomas undertook the project with the help of a small but dedicated team. The Palace opened its doors to the public again in October 2000 and built a loyal following for its music-centred atmosphere featuring weekly gigs and a Saturday night DJ residency featuring Bristol's legendary DJ Derek.

Since 2008 he has worked as a music advisor with Dartington Hall and Creative Youth Network in Bristol and as a music mentor with South West Music School. Thomas also now works as freelance Music Programmer for Salisbury Arts Centre.

Described by the BBC as having an 'open-minded, music-first, approach' he has worked on collaborative and creative projects with many artists from all over the world, including Bill Cobham and Asere, Madosini and Patrick Duff, David D'Or, Totó La Momposina, Nusrat Fateh Ali Khan, Terem Quartet and Trilok Gurtu. He has also been extensively involved in record compilation and production work.

Awards and honours
Described by The Times newspaper as a 'visionary artistic director' Thomas was also recognised in 2005 by the BBC (British Broadcasting Corporation) as recipient of the first World Shaker Award in the BBC Radio 3 Awards for World Music.

In 2008 he was made a CBE (Commander of the Order of the British Empire) in the Queen's Birthday Honours List for his life services to music and charity.

References
Citations

Bibliography

External links
Creative Youth Network
South West Music School
Interview on The World Music Foundation Podcast

1954 births
Living people
Businesspeople from Bristol
People educated at Bristol Grammar School
Alumni of Exeter College, Oxford
Commanders of the Order of the British Empire